The first biblical text in Ainu language appeared in 1887, when a tentative edition of 250 copies of Matthew 1-9, translated from the Greek with the aid of the Revised Version, by John Batchelor, assisted by a local Ainu, was published. Matthew and Jonah, by the same translator, were issued in 1889, the proofs being read by Mr. George Braithwaite, the agent of the British and Foreign Bible Society in Japan. In 1891 Mr. Batchelor returned to England and published the remaining Gospels. In 1893 a tentative edition of 300 each of Galatians, Ephesians, and Philippians, by the same translator, was prepared, which was published at Yokohama by a joint committee of the three Bible Societies (British and Foreign, American, and National of Scotland) in 1894. The Psalms and revised Gospels were issued in 1895. In 1897 a revised New Testament, by the same translator, with Ainu aid, was published at Yokohama by the joint committee.

List of Bible translations into Ainu
 John Batchelor (1897). Seisho Shinyaku Ainu 聖書・新約: アイヌ [New Testament in Ainu]. Printed for the Bible Society's committee for Japan by the Yokohama bunsha.
 British and Foreign Bible Society (1891). St. Mark, St. Luke, and St. John in Ainu. London: British and Foreign Bible Society.

References

Ainu languages
Christianity in Japan
Ainu